Gura Humorului (Hebrew and Yiddish: גורה חומורולוי - Gure Humuruluei or גורא הומאָרא - Gura Humora; German and Polish: Gura Humora) is a town in Suceava County, northeastern Romania. It is situated in the historical region of Bukovina.

Gura Humorului is the seventh largest urban settlement in the county, with a population of 13,667 inhabitants, according to the 2011 census. It was declared a town in 1904 and it became a resort in 2005. The town administers the former village of Voroneț (which became a neighborhood), site of Voroneț Monastery.

Administration and local politics

Town council 

The town's current local council has the following political composition, according to the results of the 2020 Romanian local elections:

Geography 

Gura Humorului is located in the north-eastern part of Romania, in southern Bukovina. The town is situated at the eastern limit of Obcinele Bucovinei Mountains, in Humorului Depression, at the confluence of Moldova River and Humor River. The European route E58 and the Suceava–Vatra Dornei railway pass through the town.

Demographics 

In order to encourage the development of this sparsely-settled land, the authorities subsidized the immigration of colonists to Bukovina. With the end of the first wave of settlement, colonists were to continue arriving at their own expense. As a result of these policies, the census of 1910 showed that the population had risen to over 800,000. People of many different ethnic groups took part in this immigration, including Germans, Rusyns, Hungarians, Ukrainians, Poles, Romanians, and Jews.

In 1992, Gura Humorului had a population of about 17,000 inhabitants were living within the town limits. As of 2016, the town's population surpassed this limit by a very slim margin.

According to the 2011 census data, Gura Humorului had a total population of 13,667 inhabitants: 97.03% were ethnic Romanians, 1.79% Roma, 0.52% Germans (Bukovina Germans), 0.27% Poles, 0.12% Ukrainians, 0.10% Hungarians, and 0.07% Russians (including Lipovans).

Gura Humorului is the seventh most populated urban locality in Suceava County and the second most populated locality with the status of town (after Vicovu de Sus).

History 

Between 1774 and 1918, Gura Humorului belonged to the Habsburg monarchy. During World War I, Bukovina became a battlefield between Austria opposing Russian and Romanian troops. Although the Russians were finally driven out in 1917, defeated Austria would cede the Bukovina province to Romania through the Treaty of Saint-Germain (1919).

Jewish history of Gura Humorului 

No Jews lived in Gura Humorului before 1835, when they were allowed to settle, joining other, already represented, ethnic groups (such as Germans from Bohemia, mainly from the Böhmerwald: thirty families settled on the mountainous and densely forested lands nearby the town, establishing a quarter named Bori). The Jewish community began to flourish in 1869, when they formed around a third of the town's population (880 people); the same year, a Beth midrash was established.

A turning point in the town's history was the disastrous fire of May 11, 1899 which destroyed most of the town, more than 400 houses, including many Jewish businesses and homes. It was rebuilt with donations from American Jewish communities. The Jewish community in Gura Humorului continued to grow, reaching 1,951 members in 1927.

Jewish cultural life reached its peak in the inter-war period. The languages of choice in city life were Yiddish, German and Romanian. Most of the Jewish community adhered to Orthodox Judaism, and Jewish youngsters studied the Torah along with secular subjects such as geography, history, and mathematics. The community had established Jewish social and political institutions that contributed to all fields of public life.

While persecutions began to increase under the threats posed by Romanian fascist movements such as the Iron Guard, it was World War II that brought an end to Jewish presence in Gura Humorului. Under the dictatorship of Ion Antonescu, Jews were rounded up and deported to Transnistria, where most of them perished – mass murdered through various means, including shootings and criminal negligence (see Holocaust in Romania). Virtually all of the Jewish community in Gura Humorului was deported: 2,945 people were all transported on October 10, 1941.

The vast majority of survivors migrated to Israel in 1947–1951. Statistics show that they numbered below 500 people in all at the time of their departure.

Twin towns – sister cities 

  Marly-le-Roi, France
  Puck, Poland
  Sulina, Romania

Natives 

 Andreea Boghian - rower
 Nathan Juran - American film director
 Olha Kobylianska - Ukrainian-German writer
 Viorel Lucaci - rugby player
 Mihai Macovei - rugby player
 Rixi Markus - bridge player
 Vlad Nistor - rugby player
 Daniel Plai - rugby player
 Victor Săhleanu - physician and anthropologist
 Dorin Semeghin - footballer
 Cătălin Țăranu - professional go player (5 Dan)
 Salomon Wininger - biographer

Gallery

References

External links 

  Gura Humorului Town Hall official site
  Gura Humorului touristic site
  Gura Humorului unofficial site
  Tourism Guide - Gura Humorului web page
  Suceava County site - Gura Humorului web page
  Photo Gallery - Old photos of Gura Humorului
  Gura Humorului Jewish Community
  Comprehensive lists of Gura Humorului Jews killed in 1941

Towns in Romania
Populated places in Suceava County
Spa towns in Romania
Shtetls
Bukovina-German people
Jewish communities in Romania
Duchy of Bukovina
Localities in Southern Bukovina
Holocaust locations in Romania
Polish communities in Romania